Daviesia nudiflora is a species of flowering plant in the family Fabaceae and is endemic to the south-west of Western Australia. It is a bushy shrub with sharply pointed, egg-shaped to elliptic or oblong phyllodes, and yellow-orange flowers with reddish-brown markings.

Description

Taxonomy
Daviesia nudiflora was first formally described in 1844 by Carl Meissner in Lehmann's Plantae Preissianae from specimens collected near Lake Monger in 1839. The specific epithet (nudiflora) means "naked-flowered".

In 1995, Michael Crisp described four subspecies and the names are accepted by the Australian Plant Census:
 Daviesia nudiflora subsp. amplectens Crisp has its phyllodes evenly distributed along the branchlets, spreading at 60-90°, with a heart-shaped, stem-clasping base, and a pod  broad;
 Daviesia nudiflora subsp. drummondii (Meisn.) Crisp has its phyllodes evenly distributed along the branchlets, ascending at 0–30°, with a tapering base, and a pod  broad;
 Daviesia nudiflora subsp. hirtella Crisp has its phyllodes crowded near the tips of the branchles, spreading at 30–90°, but scale-like near the base of the plant, the edges of the phyllodes often with bristly hairs;
 Daviesia nudiflora Meisn. subsp. nudiflora is entirely glabrous and has its phyllodes crowded near the tips of the branchles, spreading at 30–90°, but scale-like near the base of the plant.

Distribution and habitat
This daviesia grows in mallee-heath with a shrubby understorey, and is widespread in the northern half of the wheatbelt, from near Kalbarri to near Lake Grace with disjunct populations near Bunbury and Southern Cross. Subspecies amplectens is restricted to the area from near Cadoux to  near Dowerin, subsp. drummondii between Ballidu, York and Corrigin. Subspecies hirtella is found between Kalbarri, Regans Ford and Corrigin, and subsp. nudiflora has about the same distribution as the species, in the Avon Wheatbelt, Coolgardie, Geraldton Sandplains, Jarrah Forest, Mallee and Swan Coastal Plain biogeographic regions of south-western Western Australia.

Conservation status
Daviesia nudiflora is listed as "not threatened" by the Government of Western Australia Department of Biodiversity, Conservation and Attractions, but subsp. drummondii is listed as "Priority Three", meaning that it is poorly known and known from only a few locations but is not under imminent threat, and subsp. amplectens as "Priority One", meaning that it is known from only one or a few locations that are potentially at risk.

References

External links 
 The Australasian Virtual Herbarium – Occurrence data for Daviesia nudiflora

nudiflora
Flora of Western Australia
Taxa named by Carl Meissner
Plants described in 1844